Centrodera autumnata is a species of flower longhorn in the family Cerambycidae. It is found in North America.

References

 Monné, Miguel A., and Edmund F. Giesbert (1995). Checklist of the Cerambycidae and Disteniidae (Coleoptera) of the Western Hemisphere, 2nd ed., xiv + 420.

Further reading

 Arnett, R.H. Jr., M. C. Thomas, P. E. Skelley and J. H. Frank. (eds.). (2002). American Beetles, Volume II: Polyphaga: Scarabaeoidea through Curculionoidea. CRC Press LLC, Boca Raton, FL.
 Arnett, Ross H. (2000). American Insects: A Handbook of the Insects of America North of Mexico. CRC Press.
 Richard E. White. (1983). Peterson Field Guides: Beetles. Houghton Mifflin Company.

Lepturinae
Beetles described in 1963